The 1952–53 Michigan Wolverines men's ice hockey team represented the University of Michigan in college ice hockey. In its ninth year under head coach Vic Heyliger, the team compiled a 17–7–0 record, outscored opponents 139 to 71, and won the 1953 NCAA Division I Men's Ice Hockey Tournament.  The season was the third consecutive, and the fourth overall under Vic Heyliger, in which the Michigan hockey team won the NCAA championship.  The team also finished the regular season in at tie with Minnesota as the co-champion of the Midwest Collegiate Hockey League.

Individual accomplishments
Team captain John Matchefts, a senior from Eveleth, Minnesota, was the leading scorer with 48 points on 18 goals and 30 assists. Michigan left wing Johnny McKennell, a senior from Toronto, was suspended for the remainder of the season after he allegedly punched referee Milo Yalich in Denver, Colorado, following a 5-4 overtime loss to the Denver Pioneers on December 23, 1952.  McKennell was accused of slugging Yalich three times while disputing Denver's game-winning overtime goal.  Athletic director Fritz Crisler announced the suspension after receiving a notarized report from the president of the Rocky Mountain Hockey Officials Association in early January 1953.  McKennell denied hitting the referee and claimed that he was the victim of a plot by Colorado College coach Cheddy Thompson to "get even" with Michigan coach Vic Heyliger.  Heyliger opined that the suspension was too severe, noting that McKennell had no prior disciplinary action in three years and the evidence was conflicting as to whether McKennell even hit Yalich.  Heyliger noted, "This has ruined Johnny's whole college career."

Right winger Earl Keyes, who served as captain of the 1951–52 Michigan hockey team, graduated in January 1953 and played his final game for the Wolverines on January 17, 1953.  At the time, The Michigan Daily called Keyes "[o]ne of the best players in Michigan hockey history" and praised him for his versatility.  Keyes played at the center position for two-and-a-half years, moved to right wing in 1952, appeared in several games as a defensemen, and even played at the goalie position for two games.  In two games at goalie, he had 49 saves in back-to-back victories over Michigan Tech during the 1950-51 season.

Earl Keyes, Alex MacLellan, John Matchefts and John McKennell are the only men's ice hockey players in NCAA history to win three national titles. Additionally, they are among the only players to play in a national championship game each season in which they had eligibility (3 seasons for players prior to 1969, 4 seasons for players after 1969).

1953 NCAA Tournament
In the  1953 NCAA Division I Men's Ice Hockey Tournament, Michigan and Minnesota were invited to represent the west, and Boston University and Rensselaer Polytechnic were invited to represent the east.  In the first round, the Wolverines defeated the Boston University Terriers by a 14-2 score.

In the championship game, Michigan faced Minnesota before a capacity crowd of 2,700 at Broadmoor Arena in Colorado Springs, Colorado.  Michigan and Minnesota had played four games in the regular season, with Minnesota winning three of the four contests. In mid-February, the Golden Gophers had swept a two-game series in Minneapolis by scores of 5-2 and 4-0.

Minnesota led 2-1 at the end of the first period of the championship game.  Jim Haas gave Michigan a 1-0 lead with a goal at the 5:48 mark of the opening period (assist by Alex MacLellan), but Minnesota took the lead on goals by Dick Meredith and Dick Dougherty.  In the second period, Michigan scored two goals to take a 3-2 lead.  Doug Philpott scored at the 6:15 mark (with an assist by Reg Shave) to tie the score at 2-2, and Doug Mullen put Michigan in the lead with a goal at the 11:08 mark (with assists by George Chin and Pat Cooney).  Michigan added three goals in the first ten minutes of the third period to extend the lead to 6-2.  John Matchefts scored an unassisted power play goal at 3:38 of the third period; Jim Haas added an unassisted goal at the 7:17 mark; and Doug Philpott scored on a power play at 9:14 with an assist from Haas.  Minnesota scored on a goal by Yackel at 10:42, and Matchefts closed out the scoring with an empty net goal with 11 second left in the game (assist by Philpott).  With four goals in the third period, Michigan won its third consecutive NCAA championship, defeating the Golden Gophers by a 7-3 score.

Alex McLellan and John Matchefts were chosen for the first-team All-Tournament Team.  Matchefts was named the Most Outstanding Player in the tournament.

Standings

Schedule 

|-
!colspan=12 style=";" | Regular Season

|-
!colspan=12 style=";" |

Roster and scoring statistics

Albert P. Pickus, a senior from Sioux City, Iowa, was awarded the Manager's "M" for his service as the team's manager.

1953 national championship

Minnesota vs. Michigan

See also
1953 NCAA Division I Men's Ice Hockey Tournament
List of NCAA Division I Men's Ice Hockey Tournament champions

References

Michigan Wolverines men's ice hockey seasons
Michigan
Michigan
Michigan
Michigan
1953 in sports